was a railway station on the Rumoi Main Line in Rumoi, Hokkaido, Japan, operated by Hokkaido Railway Company (JR Hokkaido). Opened in 1921, the station closed on 4 December 2016.

Lines

Adjacent stations

History
The station opened on 5 November 1921. With the privatization of Japanese National Railways (JNR) on 1 April 1987, the station came under the control of JR Hokkaido.

Closure plans
On 10 August 2015, JR Hokkaido announced its plans to close the 16.7 km section of the line beyond Rumoi to Mashike in 2016. In April 2016, it was officially announced that the section from Rumoi to Mashike would be closing in December 2016, with the last services operating on 4 December.

See also
 List of railway stations in Japan

References

External links

 JR Hokkaido station information 

Stations of Hokkaido Railway Company
Railway stations in Hokkaido Prefecture
Railway stations in Japan opened in 1921
Railway stations closed in 2016
2016 disestablishments in Japan